Rhoticity in English is the pronunciation of the historical rhotic consonant  by English speakers. The presence or absence of rhoticity is one of the most prominent distinctions by which varieties of English can be classified. In rhotic varieties, the historical English  sound is preserved in all pronunciation contexts. In non-rhotic varieties, speakers no longer pronounce  in postvocalic environments—that is, when it is immediately after a vowel and not followed by another vowel.

The rhotic varieties of English include the dialects of South West England, Scotland, Ireland, and most of the United States and Canada. The non-rhotic varieties include most of the dialects of modern England, Wales, Australia, New Zealand, and South Africa. In some varieties, such as those of some parts of the southern and northeastern United States, rhoticity is a sociolinguistic variable: postvocalic r is deleted depending on an array of social factors, such as being more correlated today with lower socioeconomic status, greater age, certain ethnic identities, and less formal speaking contexts.

Evidence from written documents suggests that loss of postvocalic /r/ began sporadically during the mid-15th century, although these /r/-less spellings were uncommon and were restricted to private documents, especially ones written by women in England. In the mid-18th century, postvocalic /r/ was still pronounced in most environments, but by the 1740s to 1770s it was often deleted entirely, especially after low vowels. By the early 19th century, the southern British standard was fully transformed into a non-rhotic variety, though some variation persisted as late as the 1870s.

In the 18th century (and possibly 17th century), the loss of postvocalic  in British English influenced southern and eastern American port cities with close connections to Britain, causing their upper-class pronunciation to become non-rhotic while the rest of the United States remained rhotic. Non-rhotic pronunciation continued to influence American prestige speech until the 1860s, when the American Civil War began to shift America's centers of wealth and political power to rhotic areas with fewer cultural connections to the old colonial and British elites. In the United States, non-rhotic speech continued to hold some level of prestige up until the mid-20th century, but rhotic speech in particular became prestigious nationwide rapidly after the Second World War, reflected in the national standard of radio and television since the mid-20th century embracing historical .

History

England

A second phase of -loss began during the 15th century and was characterized by sporadic and lexically variable deletion, such as monyng 'morning' and cadenall 'cardinal'. These -less spellings appeared throughout the 16th and 17th centuries, but they were uncommon and were restricted to private documents, especially ones written by women.

During the mid-17th century, several sources described  as being weakened but still present.  The English playwright Ben Jonson's English Grammar, published posthumously in 1640, recorded that  was "sounded firme in the beginning of words, and more liquid in the middle, and ends."  The next major documentation of the pronunciation of  appeared a century later, in 1740, when the British author of a primer for French students of English said that "in many words r before a consonant is greatly softened, almost mute, and slightly lengthens the preceding vowel."

By the 1770s, postvocalic -less pronunciation was becoming common around London even in formal educated speech.  The English actor and linguist John Walker used the spelling ar to indicate the long vowel of aunt in his 1775 rhyming dictionary. In his influential Critical Pronouncing Dictionary and Expositor of the English Language (1791), Walker reported, with a strong tone of disapproval, that "the r in lard, bard,... is pronounced so much in the throat as to be little more than the middle or Italian a, lengthened into baa, baad...." Americans returning to England after the American Revolutionary War, which lasted from 1775 to 1783, reported surprise at the significant changes in fashionable pronunciation that had taken place.

By the early 19th century, the southern English standard had been fully transformed into a non-rhotic variety, although it continued to be variable in the 1870s. The extent of rhoticity in England in the mid-19th century is summarized as widespread in the book New Zealand English: its Origins and Evolution:

In the late 19th century, Alexander John Ellis found evidence of accents being overwhelmingly rhotic in urban areas which are now firmly non-rhotic, such as Birmingham and the Black Country, and Wakefield in West Yorkshire.

The Survey of English Dialects in the 1950s and '60s recorded rhotic or partially rhotic accents in almost every part of England, including in the counties of West Yorkshire, East Yorkshire, Lincolnshire, Cumbria, and Kent, where rhoticity has since disappeared.

United States
The loss of postvocalic  in the British prestige standard in the late 18th and early 19th centuries influenced American port cities with close connections to Britain, causing upper-class pronunciation to become non-rhotic in many eastern and southern port cities such as New York City, Boston, Alexandria, Charleston, and Savannah.

Non-rhotic pronunciation continued to influence American prestige speech until the 1860s, when the American Civil War shifted America's centers of wealth and political power to areas with fewer cultural connections to the old colonial and British elites. This largely removed the prestige associated with non-rhotic pronunciation in America. These colonial influences may be the reason that African-American Vernacular English (AAVE) is largely non-rhotic today; former slaves migrated across the United States from southern regions where non-rhotic speech would have been prestigious.

The standard broadcasting pronunciation of national radio and television in the early 20th century favored rhoticity, aligning more with Midwestern and non-coastal Americans, and thus preserving historical . The increased prestige of rhotic American accents further accelerated after World War II.

Modern pronunciation 
That phenomenon is referred to as "linking R". Many non-rhotic speakers also insert an epenthetic  between vowels when the first vowel is one that can occur before syllable-final r (drawring for drawing). The so-called "intrusive R" has been stigmatized, but many speakers of Received Pronunciation (RP) now frequently "intrude" an epenthetic  at word boundaries, especially if one or both vowels is schwa. For example, the idea of it becomes the idea-r-of it, Australia and New Zealand becomes Australia-r-and New Zealand, the formerly well-known India-r-Office and "Laura Norder" (Law and Order). The typical alternative used by RP speakers (and some rhotic speakers as well) is to insert a glottal stop wherever an intrusive R would otherwise have been placed.

That is called compensatory lengthening, which occurs after the elision of a sound. However, they have other realizations as well, including monophthongal ones. Once again, the pronunciations vary from accent to accent. For some speakers, some long vowels alternate with a diphthong ending in schwa and so wear may be  but wearing  .

Examples include the dropping of the first  in the words surprise, governor, and caterpillar. In more careful speech, however, all  sounds are still retained.

Distribution 

Rhotic accents include most varieties of Scottish English, Irish or Hiberno-English, Canadian English, American English, Barbadian English and Philippine English.

Non-rhotic accents include most varieties of English English, Welsh English, New Zealand English, Australian English, South African English, Trinidadian and Tobagonian English, Standard Malaysian English and Singaporean English.

Semi-rhotic accents have also been studied, such as Jamaican English, in which r is pronounced (as in even non-rhotic accents) before vowels, but also in stressed monosyllables or stressed syllables at the ends of words (e.g. in "car" or "dare"); however, it is not pronounced at the end of unstressed syllables (e.g. in "water") or before consonants (e.g. "market").

Variably rhotic accents are also widely documented, in which deletion of r (when not before vowels) is optional; in these dialects the probability of deleting r may vary depending on social, stylistic, and contextual factors. Variably rhotic accents comprise much of Indian English, Pakistani English, and Caribbean English, for example, as spoken in Tobago, Guyana, Antigua and Barbuda, and the Bahamas. They also include current-day New York City English, most modern varieties of Southern American English, New York Latino English, and some Boston English, as well as some varieties of Scottish English.

Non-rhotic accents in the Americas include those of the rest of the Caribbean and Belize. Additionally, there are people with non-rhotic accents who are children of at least one rhotic-accented parent but grew up, or were educated, in non-rhotic countries like Australia, England, New Zealand, South Africa, or Wales. By contrast, people who have at least one non-rhotic-accented parent but were raised, or started their education, in Canada, any rhotic Caribbean country, Ireland, Scotland, or the United States, speak with rhotic accents.

England 
Though most English varieties in England are non-rhotic today, stemming from a trend toward this in southeastern England accelerating in the very late 18th century onwards, rhotic accents are still found in the West Country (south and west of a line from near Shrewsbury to around Portsmouth, including parts of the West Midlands), the Corby area (due to migration from Scotland in the 1930s), some of Lancashire (north and west of the centre of Manchester, increasingly among older and rural speakers only), some parts of Yorkshire and Lincolnshire, and in the areas that border Scotland. The prestige form, however, exerts a steady pressure toward non-rhoticity. Thus the urban speech of Bristol or Southampton is more accurately described as variably rhotic, the degree of rhoticity being reduced as one moves up the class and formality scales.

Scotland 
Most Scottish accents are rhotic, but non-rhotic speech has been reported in Edinburgh since the 1970s and Glasgow since the 1980s.

Wales
Welsh English is mostly non-rhotic, however variably rhotic accents are present in accents influenced by Welsh, especially in North Wales.

United States 

American English is predominantly rhotic today, but at the end of the 19th century non-rhotic accents were common throughout much of the coastal Eastern and Southern U.S., including along the Gulf Coast. In fact, non-rhotic accents were established in all major U.S. cities along the Atlantic coast except for the Delaware Valley area centered around Philadelphia and Baltimore, due to its early Scots-Irish rhotic influence. After the American Civil War and even more intensely during the early to mid-20th century (presumably correlated with the Second World War), rhotic accents began to gain social prestige nationwide, even in the aforementioned traditionally non-rhotic areas. Thus, non-rhotic accents are increasingly perceived by Americans as sounding foreign or less educated due to an association with working-class or immigrant speakers in Eastern and Southern cities, while rhotic accents are increasingly perceived as sounding more "General American".

Today, non-rhoticity in the American South among whites is found primarily among older speakers, and only in some areas such as central and southern Alabama; Savannah, Georgia; and Norfolk, Virginia, as well as in the Yat accent of New Orleans. However it is still very common all across the South and across all age groups among African American speakers. The local dialects of eastern New England, especially Boston, Massachusetts, extending into the states of Maine and (less so) New Hampshire, show some non-rhoticity, as well as the traditional Rhode Island dialect; however, this feature has been receding in the recent generations. The New York City dialect is traditionally non-rhotic, though William Labov more precisely classifies its current form as variably rhotic, with many of its sub-varieties now fully rhotic, such as in northeastern New Jersey.

African-American Vernacular English (AAVE) is largely non-rhotic, and in some non-rhotic Southern and AAVE accents, there is no linking r, that is,  at the end of a word is deleted even when the following word starts with a vowel, so that "Mister Adams" is pronounced . In a few such accents, intervocalic  is deleted before an unstressed syllable even within a word when the following syllable begins with a vowel. This pronunciation also occurs in AAVE and also occurred for many older non-rhotic Southern speakers. Nonetheless, AAVE spoken in areas where non-AAVE speakers are rhotic is likelier to be rhotic, and rhoticity is also generally commoner among young AAVE speakers.

Canada 
Canadian English is entirely rhotic except for small isolated areas in southwestern New Brunswick, parts of Newfoundland, and the Lunenburg English variety spoken in Lunenburg and Shelburne Counties, Nova Scotia, which may be non-rhotic or variably rhotic.

Ireland 

The prestige form of English spoken in Ireland is rhotic and most regional accents are rhotic although some regional accents, particularly in the area around counties Louth and Cavan are notably non-rhotic and many non-prestige accents have touches of non-rhoticity.  In Dublin, the traditional local dialect is largely non-rhotic but the more modern varieties, referred to by Hickey as "mainstream Dublin English" and "fashionable Dublin English", are fully rhotic.  Hickey used this as an example of how English in Ireland does not follow prestige trends in England.

Asia 
The English spoken in Asia is predominantly rhotic. In the case of the Philippines, this may be explained because the English that is spoken there is heavily influenced by the American dialect and because of Spanish influence in the various Philippine languages. In addition, many East Asians (in Mainland China, Japan, Korea, and Taiwan) who have a good command of English generally have rhotic accents because of the influence of American English. This excludes Hong Kong, whose English dialect is a result of its almost 150-year history as a British Crown colony (and later, a British dependent territory). The lack of consonant /r/ in Cantonese also contributes to the phenomenon (although rhoticity started to exist due to the handover in 1997 and influence by US and East Asian entertainment industry). However, many older (and younger) speakers among South and East Asians have a non-rhotic accent. Speakers of Semitic (Arabic, Hebrew, etc), Turkic (Turkish, Azeri, etc), Iranian languages (Persian, Kurdish, etc) in West Asia would also speak English with a rhotic pronunciation due to the inherent phonotactics of their native languages.

Indian English is variably rhotic, and can vary between being non-rhotic due to most education systems being based on British English or rhotic due to the underlying phonotactics of the native Indo-Aryan and Dravidian languages and the influence of American English. Other Asian regions with non-rhotic English are Malaysia, Singapore, and Brunei. A typical Malaysian's English would be almost totally non-rhotic due to the nonexistence of rhotic endings in both languages of influence, whereas a more educated Malaysian's English may be non-rhotic due to Standard Malaysian English being based on RP (Received Pronunciation). The classical English spoken in Brunei is non-rhotic. But one current change that seems to be taking place is that Brunei English is becoming rhotic, partly influenced by American English and partly influenced by the rhoticity of Standard Malay, also influenced by languages of Indians in Brunei (Tamil and Punjabi) (rhoticity is also used by Chinese Bruneians), although English in neighboring Malaysia and Singapore remains non-rhotic; rhoticity in Brunei English is equal to Philippine dialects of English and Scottish and Irish dialects. Non-rhoticity is mostly found in older generations, its phenomenon is almost similar to the status of American English, wherein non-rhoticity reduced greatly.

A typical teenager's Southeast Asian English would be rhotic, mainly because of prominent influence by American English. Spoken English in Myanmar is non-rhotic, but there are a number of English speakers with a rhotic or partially rhotic pronunciation. Sri Lankan English may be rhotic.

Africa 
The English spoken in most of Africa is based on RP and is generally non-rhotic. Pronunciation and variation in African English accents are largely affected by native African language influences, level of education and exposure to Western influences. The English accents spoken in the coastal areas of West Africa are primarily non-rhotic as are the underlying varieties of Niger-Congo languages spoken in that part of West Africa. Rhoticity may be present in English spoken in areas where rhotic Afro-Asiatic or Nilo Saharan languages are spoken across northern West Africa and in the Nilotic regions of East Africa. More modern trends show an increasing American influence on African English pronunciation particularly among younger urban affluent populations, where the American rhotic 'r' may be over-stressed in informal communication to create a pseudo-Americanised accent. By and large official spoken English used in post colonial African countries is non-rhotic. Standard Liberian English is also non-rhotic because liquids are lost at the end of words or before consonants. South African English is mostly non-rhotic, especially Cultivated dialect based on RP, except for some Broad varieties spoken in the Cape Province (typically in -er suffixes, as in writer). It appears that postvocalic  is entering the speech of younger people under the influence of American English, and maybe an influence of Scottish dialect brought by Scottish settlers.

Australia 
Standard Australian English is non-rhotic. A degree of rhoticity has been observed in a particular sublect of Australian Aboriginal English spoken on the coast of South Australia, especially in speakers from the Point Pearce and Raukkan settlements. These speakers realise /r/ as [ɹ] in the preconsonantal postvocalic position – after a vowel but before another a consonant – but only within stems. For example: [boːɹd] "board", [tʃɜɹtʃ] "church", [pɜɹθ] "Perth"; but [flæː] "flour", [dɒktə] "doctor", [jɪəz] "years". It has been speculated that this feature may derive from the fact that many of the first settlers in coastal South Australia – including Cornish tin-miners, Scottish missionaries, and American whalers – spoke rhotic varieties.

New Zealand 
Although New Zealand English is predominantly non-rhotic, Southland and parts of Otago in the far south of New Zealand's South Island are rhotic from apparent Scottish influence. Many Māori and Pasifika people, who tend to speak a specific dialect of English (which is not limited to them) also speak with strong Rs. Older Southland speakers use  variably after vowels, but today younger speakers use  only with the  vowel and occasionally with the  vowel. Younger Southland speakers pronounce  in third term  but sometimes in farm cart  (same as in General NZE). However, non-prevocalic  among non-rhotic speakers is sometimes pronounced in a few words, including Ireland , merely , err , and the name of the letter R . The Māori accent varies from the European-origin New Zealand accent; some Māori speakers are semi-rhotic, although it is not clearly identified to any particular region or attributed to any defined language shift. The Māori language itself tends in most cases to use an r with an alveolar tap , like Scottish dialect.

Mergers characteristic of non-rhotic accents 
Some phonemic mergers are characteristic of non-rhotic accents. These usually include one item that historically contained an R (lost in the non-rhotic accent), and one that never did so.

Batted–battered merger 
This merger is present in non-rhotic accents which have undergone the weak vowel merger. Such accents include Australian, New Zealand, most South African speech, and some non-rhotic English speech (e.g. Norfolk, Sheffield).

A large number of homophonous pairs involve the syllabic -es and agentive -ers suffixes, such as merges-mergers and bleaches-bleachers.  Because there are so many, they are excluded from the list of homophonous pairs below.

Bud–bird merger 
Some speakers, mostly rural, in the area from London to Norfolk exhibit this conversion, mainly before voiceless fricatives. This gives pronunciation like first  and worse . The word cuss appears to derive from the application of this sound change to the word curse. Similarly, lurve is coined from love.

– merger 
In the terminology of John C. Wells, this consists of the merger of the lexical sets comma and letter. It is found in all or nearly all non-rhotic accents and is present even in some accents that are in other respects rhotic, such as those of some speakers in Jamaica and the Bahamas.

In some accents, syllabification may interact with rhoticity and result in homophones for which non-rhotic accents have centering diphthongs. Possibilities include Korea–career, Shi'a–sheer, and Maia–mire, and skua may be identical with the second syllable of obscure.

merger 

In Jamaican Patois, the merged vowel is an opening diphthong  and that realization can also be heard in Jamaican English, mostly before a sounded  (so that fare and fear can be both  and ), but sometimes also in other positions. Alternatively,  can be laxed to  before a sounded , which produces a variable Mary-merry merger: .

It is possible in northern East Anglian varieties (to ), but only in the case of items descended from ME , such as daze. Those descended from ME  (such as days),  and  have a distinctive  vowel. The merger appears to be receding, as items descended from ME  are being transferred to the  class; in other words, a pane-pain merger is taking place.

The difference between the two phonemes is so sometimes subtle that they're  can be misheard as they  (see zero copula). In other varieties the difference is more noticeable, e.g.  vs.  in Broad SAE and  vs.  in the Cultivated variety. The latter is used not only for  but also in the  set, so that fur is homophonous with fair as  - see square-nurse merger.

In the Cardiff dialect  can also be similar to cardinal  (though long , as in South Africa), but  typically has a fully close ending point  and thus the vowels are more distinct than in the General South African accent. An alternative realization of the former is an open-mid monophthong . Formerly,  was sometimes realized as a narrow diphthong , but this has virtually disappeared by the 1990s.  is phonemically distinct, normally as  before any  (a fleece–near merger) and a disyllabic  elsewhere.

Some of the words listed below may have different forms in traditional Geordie. For a related merger not involving , see near-square merger.

Father–farther and god–guard mergers 
In Wells' terminology, the father–farther merger consists of the merger of the lexical sets PALM and START. It is found in the speech of the great majority of non-rhotic speakers, including those of England, Wales, the United States, the Caribbean, Australia, New Zealand and South Africa. It may be absent in some non-rhotic speakers in the Bahamas.

Minimal pairs are rare in accents without the father-bother merger. In most non-rhotic American English (that includes non-rhotic Rhode Island, New York City, some Southern U.S., and some African-American accents), the spelling  is equally common in non-word-final positions due to the aforementioned father-bother merger. Those accents have the god-guard merger (a merger of LOT and START) in addition to the father–farther merger, yielding a three-way homophony between calmer (when pronounced without ), comma and karma, though minimal triplets like this are scarce.

Foot–goose–thought–north–force merger 

Goat–thought–north–force merger 
It occurs in certain non-rhotic varieties of British English, such as Bradford English and Geordie (particularly among females). The phonetic outcome of the merger is an open-mid monophthong  in Bradford.

Thus, bawling  and bowling  can be nearly homophonous, though bawling can be  or  instead.

It may be found in some southern U.S. non-rhotic speech, some speakers of African-American English and some speakers in Guyana and Northern Wales. In Northern Wales, a complete goat–thought–north–force merger is sometimes encountered, though this requires further study. In either case, the merger in Welsh English applies only to the  items descended from Early Modern English , see toe-tow merger.

Goat–comma–letter merger
It analogous to the weak vowel merger, and like it occurs only in unstressed positions. The mid  occurs in other non-rhotic accents. An r-colored  occurs instead in parts of the west of England and in Appalachian English, preserving the Middle English phonotactic constraint against final : . In those dialects, the final  (as in data and sofa) is distinct, yielding a goat-letter merger. Both are restricted to the broadest varieties of English.

In cockney, the resulting  is subject to -insertion, as in tomato and cucumber production .

Before vowels, only  occurs.

There are almost no minimal pairs to illustrate that merger.

Lot–thought–north–force merger 
The lot–thought–north–force merger occurs in cockney in fast speech (though only in the morpheme-final position in the case of //; in the morpheme-internal position  is used instead - see thought split), so that ignored  may rhyme with nod  as  vs. . Because of the cure-force merger, some of the  words also join this neutralization. The lot-thought-north merger (with a distinct  vowel ) may be also present in some Eastern New England accents.

The lot-thought-north-force merger is also present in Singapore English.

The name is inappropriate in the case of cockney, where short  is always distinct from shot . Therefore, the columns labelled as morpheme-internal always have a distinct  vowel in cockney.

Pawn–porn and caught–court mergers 
In Wells' terminology, the pawn–porn merger consists of the merger of the lexical sets THOUGHT and NORTH. It is found in most of the same accents as the father–farther merger described above, but is absent from the Bahamas and Guyana.

Labov et al. suggest that, in New York City English, this merger is present in perception not production.

Most speakers with the pawn-porn merger also have the same vowels in caught and court (a merger of THOUGHT and FORCE), yielding a three-way merger of awe-or-ore/oar (see horse-hoarse merger). These include the accents of Southern England (but see THOUGHT split), non-rhotic New York City speakers, Trinidad and the Southern hemisphere.

The lot-cloth split coupled with those mergers produces a few more homophones, such as boss–bourse. Specifically, the phonemic merger of the words often and orphan was a running gag in the Gilbert and Sullivan musical, The Pirates of Penzance.

Paw–poor merger 
In Wells' terminology, this consists of the merger of the lexical sets THOUGHT and CURE. It is found in those non-rhotic accents containing the caught–court merger that have also undergone the pour–poor merger. Wells lists it unequivocally only for the accent of Trinidad, but it is an option for non-rhotic speakers in England, Australia and New Zealand. Such speakers have a potential four-way merger taw–tor–tore–tour.

Show–sure merger 
In Wells' terminology, this consists of the merger of the lexical sets GOAT and CURE. It may be present in those speakers who have both the dough–door merger described above, and also the pour–poor merger. These include some southern U.S. non-rhotic speakers, some speakers of African-American English (in both cases towards ) and some speakers in Guyana.

In Geordie, the merger (towards , phonetically ) is variable and recessive. This categorically undoes the merger for those speakers.

Some of the words listed below may have different forms in traditional Geordie.

Strut–palm–start merger 
It occurs in Black South African English. The outcome of the merger is an open central vowel  or, less frequently, an open-mid back vowel . The merger co-occurs with the trap-bath split.

In Australia and New Zealand, the two vowels contrast only by length: . This (as well as -monophthongization in Australian English) introduces phonemic vowel length to those dialects.

Notably, EFL speakers who aim at the British pronunciation of can't  but fail to sufficiently lengthen the vowel are perceived as uttering a highly taboo word cunt .

Up-gliding  

Up-gliding  is a diphthongized vowel sound, used as the pronunciation of the  phoneme . This up-gliding variant historically occurred in some completely non-rhotic dialects of American English and is particularly associated with the early twentieth-century (but now extinct or moribund) dialects of New York City, New Orleans, and Charleston, likely developing in the prior century. In fact, in speakers born before World War I, this sound apparently predominated throughout older speech of the Southern United States, ranging from "South Carolina to Texas and north to eastern Arkansas and the southern edge of Kentucky." This variant only occurred when /ɜ/ came immediately before a consonant in the same word, so, for example, stir was never ; rather, stir would have been pronounced .

Coil–curl merger 
The merger is responsible for the "Brooklynese" stereotypes of bird sounding like boid and thirty-third sounding like toity-toid. This merger is also known for the word soitenly, used often by the Three Stooges comedian Curly Howard as a variant of certainly in comedy shorts of the 1930s and 1940s. The songwriter Sam M. Lewis, a native New Yorker, rhymed returning with joining in the lyrics of the English-language version of "Gloomy Sunday". Except for New Orleans English, this merger did not occur in the South, despite up-gliding  existing in some older Southern accents; instead, a distinction between the two phonemes was maintained due to a down-gliding  sound: something like .

In 1966, according to a survey that was done by William Labov in New York City, 100% of the people 60 and over used  for bird. With each younger age group, however, the percentage got progressively lower: 59% of 50- to 59-year-olds, 33% of 40- to 49-year-olds, 24% of 20- to 39-year-olds, and finally, only 4% of 8- to 19-year-olds used  for bird. However, Labov reports this vowel to be slightly raised compared to other dialects. In addition, Newman (2014) found [əɪ] variably in a native New Yorker born in the early 1990s.

Effect of non-rhotic dialects on orthography 
Certain words have spellings derived from non-rhotic dialects or renderings of foreign words through non-rhotic pronunciation. In rhotic dialects, spelling pronunciation has caused these words to be pronounced rhotically anyway. Examples include:
 Er, used in non-rhotic dialects to indicate a filled pause, which most rhotic dialects would instead convey with uh or eh.
 The game Parcheesi, from Indian Pachisi.
 British English slang words:
 In Rudyard Kipling's books:
 dorg instead of dawg for a drawled pronunciation of dog.
 Hindu god name Kama misspelled as Karma (which is a concept in several Asian religions, not a god).
 Hindustani  /   ("paper") spelled as kargaz.
 The donkey Eeyore in A.A. Milne's stories, whose name comes from the sound that donkeys make, commonly spelled hee-haw in American English.
 Southern American goober and pinder from KiKongo  and ngubá and mpinda
Burma and Myanmar for Burmese  and 
 Orlu for Igbo 
 Transliteration of Cantonese words and names, such as char siu and Wong Kar-wai
 The spelling of schoolmarm for school ma'am, which Americans pronounce with the rhotic consonant.
The spelling Park  for the Korean surname , which does not contain a liquid consonant in Korean.

See also 
English-language vowel changes before historic /r/

Notes

References

Bibliography 

 
 
 
 
 
 
 
 
 
 
 
 
  
 
 
 
 
 
 
 
 

English phonology
Rhotic consonants
Splits and mergers in English phonology